Relations between India and the United States date back to India's independence movement and have continued well after independence from the United Kingdom in 1947. Currently, India and the United States enjoy close relations and have often seen eye-to-eye on issues such as counterterrorism (including concern about Pakistan's involvement), mutual distrust of Pakistan's nuclear weapons program, and Chinese influence in the Indo-Pacific.

In 1954, the United States made Pakistan a Central Treaty Organization (CENTO) ally. As a result, India cultivated strategic and military relations with the Soviet Union to counter Pakistan–United States relations. In 1961, India became a founding member of the Non-Aligned Movement to avoid involvement in the Cold War power play between the United States and the Soviet Union. The Nixon administration's support for Pakistan during the Indo-Pakistani War of 1971 affected relations until the dissolution of the Soviet Union in 1991. In the 1990s, Indian foreign policy adapted to the unipolar world and developed closer ties with the United States.

In the twenty-first century, Indian foreign policy has sought to leverage India's strategic autonomy to safeguard sovereign rights and promote national interests within a multi-polar world. Under the administrations of Presidents George W. Bush (2001–2009) and Barack Obama (2009–2017), the United States of America has demonstrated accommodation to India's core national interests and acknowledged outstanding concerns. Increase in bilateral trade & investment, co-operation on global security matters, inclusion of India in decision-making on matters of global governance (United Nations Security Council), upgraded representation in trade & investment forums (World Bank, IMF, APEC), admission into multilateral export control regimes (MTCR, Wassenaar Arrangement, Australia Group) and support for admission in the Nuclear Suppliers Group and joint-manufacturing through technology sharing arrangements have become key milestones and a measure of speed and advancement on the path to closer US–India relations. In 2016, India and the United States signed the Logistics Exchange Memorandum of Agreement and India was declared a Major Defense Partner of the United States. Despite friction in the bilateral relationship, India and the United States have stepped up their cooperation among multilateral groups such as The Quad and I2U2 Group.

According to Gallup's annual World Affairs survey, India is perceived by Americans as their sixth favorite nation in the world, with 71% of Americans viewing India favorably in 2015. Gallup polls found that 74% of Americans viewed India favorably in 2017, 72% in 2019, 75% in 2020 and 77% in 2022.

According to a Morning Consult poll conducted in August 2021 after the fall of Afghanistan, 79% of Indians viewed the United States favorably, compared to 10% who viewed the United States unfavorably, the highest percentage out of all 15 major countries surveyed, more favorable than even how most Americans viewed the United States.

According to the data of the commerce ministry, in 2021–22, bilateral trade in goods between the two countries crossed $119.42 billion. Exports to the US increased to $76.11 billion in 2021-22 from $51.62 billion in previous fiscal year, while imports rose to $43.31 billion as compared to about $29 billion in 2020–21.

History

American Revolution and the East India Company 

Great Britain and France had territories in the Americas as well as the Indian subcontinent. In 1778, when France declared war against Britain, fighting broke out between British and French colonies in India. This marked the beginning of the Second Anglo-Mysore War. Hyder Ali, the Sultan of the Kingdom of Mysore, allied himself with the French. From 1780 to 1783, Franco-Mysorean forces fought in several campaigns against the British in western and southern India, in several places such as Mahé and Mangalore.

On June 29, with both sides weakened, the British dispatched HMS Medea to surrender, with letters to the French stating the American Revolutionary War was over. The Treaty of Paris was drafted on 30 November 1782, months before the Siege of Cuddalore but news did not reach India until seven months later, due to the delay of communications to India. The Treaty of Paris was finally signed on 3 September 1783 and was ratified by the U.S. Congress a few months later. Under the terms of the treaty, Britain returned Pondicherry back to the French and Cuddalore was returned to the British.

The flag of the East India Company is said to have inspired the Grand Union Flag of 1775, ultimately inspiring the current flag of the United States, as both flags were of the same design. Mysorean rockets were also used in the Battle of Baltimore, and are mentioned in "The Star-Spangled Banner", the national anthem of the United States: And the rockets' red glare, the bombs bursting in air.

Under British Raj (1858-1947) 

The relationships between India in the days of the British Raj and the United States were thin. Swami Vivekananda promoted Yoga and Vedanta in the United States at the World's Parliament of Religions in Chicago, during the World's Fair in 1893. Mark Twain visited India in 1896 and described it in his travelogue Following the Equator with both revulsion and attraction before concluding that India was the only foreign land he dreamed about or longed to see again. Regarding India, Americans learned more from English writer Rudyard Kipling. Mahatma Gandhi had an important influence on the philosophy of non-violence promoted by American civil rights movement leader Martin Luther King Jr. in the 1950s.

In the 1930s and early-1940s, Roosevelt voiced strong support to the Indian independence movement despite being allies with Britain. The first significant immigration from India before 1965 involved Sikh farmers going to California in the early-twentieth century.

During World War II 

During World War II, India became the main base for the American China Burma India Theater (CBI) in the war against Japan. Tens of thousands of American servicemen arrived, bringing all sorts of advanced technology, and currency; they left in 1945. Serious tension erupted over American demands, led by US President Franklin D. Roosevelt, that India be given independence, a proposition Churchill vehemently rejected. For years, Roosevelt had encouraged British disengagement from India. The American position was based on an opposition to Europeans having colonies and a practical concern for the outcome of the war, and the expectation of a large American role in a post-independence era. Churchill threatened to resign if Roosevelt continued to push his case, causing Roosevelt to back down. Meanwhile, India became the main American staging base to fly aid to China. During World War II, the Panagarh Airport in Bengal Province of India was used as a supply transport airfield from 1942 to 1945 by the United States Army Air Forces Tenth Air Force and as a repair and maintenance depot for B-24 Liberator heavy bombers by Air Technical Service Command.

Independence (1947–1997) 

The United States under the Truman administration leaned towards favouring India in the late-1940s as a consequence of most U.S. planners seeing India more valuable diplomatically than neighboring Pakistan. However, during the Cold War Nehru's policy of neutrality was cumbersome to many American observers. American officials perceived India's policy of non-alignment negatively. Ambassador Henry F. Grady told then-Indian Prime Minister Jawaharlal Nehru that the United States did not consider neutrality to be an acceptable position. Grady told the State Department in December 1947 that he had informed Nehru "that this is a question that cannot be straddled and that India should get on the democratic side immediately".  In 1948, Nehru rejected American suggestions for resolving the Kashmir crisis via third party mediation.

Nehru's 1949 tour of the United States was "an undiplomatic disaster" that left bad feelings on both sides. Nehru and his top aide V. K. Krishna Menon discussed whether India should "align with United States 'somewhat' and build up our economic and military strength."  The Truman administration was quite favorable and indicated it would give Nehru anything he asked for. Nehru refused, and thereby forfeited the chance for a gift of one million tons of wheat. The American Secretary of State Dean Acheson recognized Nehru's potential world role but added that he was "one of the most difficult men with whom I have ever had to deal." The American visit had some benefits in that Nehru gained widespread understanding and support for his nation, and he himself gained a much deeper understanding of the American outlook.

India rejected the American advice that it should not recognize the Communist conquest of China, but it did back the US when it supported the 1950 United Nations resolution condemning North Korea's aggression in the Korean War. India tried to act as a mediator to help end the war, and served as a conduit for diplomatic messages between the US and China. Although no Indian troops took part in the war, India did send a Medical Corps of 346 army doctors to help the UN side. Meanwhile, poor harvests forced India to ask for American aid for its food security, which was given starting in 1950. In the first dozen years of Indian independence (1947–59), the US provided $1,700,000,000 in aid; including $931,000,000 in food. The Soviet Union provided about half as much in monetary terms, however made much larger contributions in kind, taking the form of infrastructural aid, soft loans, technical knowledge transfer, economic planning and skills involved in the areas of steel mills, machine building, hydroelectric power and other heavy industries- especially nuclear energy and space research. In 1961, the US pledged $1,000,000,000 in development loans, in addition to $1,300,000,000 of free food.
 To ease the tensions Eisenhower sent John Sherman Cooper as ambassador in 1956–1957. Cooper got along very well with Nehru.

In terms of rhetoric, Jawaharlal Nehru—as both prime minister and foreign minister (1947–1964), promoted a moralistic rhetoric attacking both the Soviet bloc and the U.S. and its bloc. Instead Nehru tried to build a nonaligned movement, paying special attention to the many new nations in the Third World released from European colonial status at this time. President Dwight D. Eisenhower and his Secretary of State John Foster Dulles themselves used moralistic rhetoric to attack the evils of Communism.

In 1959, Eisenhower became the first US president to visit India to strengthen the staggering ties between the two nations. He was so supportive that the New York Times remarked, "It did not seem to matter much whether Nehru had actually requested or been given a guarantee that the US would help India to meet further Chinese Communist aggression. What mattered was the obvious strengthening of Indian–American friendship to a point where no such guarantee was necessary."

During John F. Kennedy's Presidency (1961–63), India was considered a strategic partner and counterweight to the rise of Communist China. Kennedy said,

However, relations took a nosedive when India annexed the Portuguese colony of Goa in 1961, in which the Kennedy administration condemned the armed action of the Indian government and demanded that all Indian forces be unconditionally withdrawn from Goan soil, at the same time, cutting all foreign aid appropriation to India by 25 percent.In response, Menon, now the Minister of Defence lectured Kennedy on the importance of US-Soviet compromise and dismissed the admonishments of Kennedy and Stevenson as "vestige(s) of Western imperialism". The Kennedy administration openly supported India during the 1962 Sino-Indian war and considered the Chinese action as "blatant Chinese Communist aggression against India". The United States Air Force flew in arms, ammunition and clothing supplies to the Indian troops and the United States Navy sent the USS Kitty Hawk aircraft carrier from the Pacific Ocean to India, though it was recalled before it reached the Bay of Bengal since the crisis had passed. In a May 1963 National Security Council meeting, the United States discussed contingency planning that could be implemented in the event of another Chinese aggression on India. Defense Secretary Robert McNamara and General Maxwell Taylor advised the president to use nuclear weapons should the Americans intervene in such a situation. Kennedy insisted that Washington defend India as it would any ally, saying, "We should defend India, and therefore we will defend India." Kennedy's ambassador to India was the noted liberal economist John Kenneth Galbraith, who was considered close to India. While in India, Galbraith helped establish one of the first Indian computer science departments, at the Indian Institute of Technology in Kanpur, Uttar Pradesh. As an economist, he also presided over the (at the time) largest US foreign aid program to any country.

Following the assassination of Kennedy in 1963, India-US relations deteriorated gradually. While Kennedy's successor Lyndon B. Johnson sought to maintain relations with India to counter Communist China, he also sought to strengthen ties with Pakistan with the hopes of easing tensions with China and weakening India's growing military buildup as well. Relations then hit an all-time low under the Nixon administration in the early 1970s. Nixon shifted away from the neutral stance which his predecessors had taken towards India-Pakistan hostilities. He established a very close relationship with Pakistan, aiding it militarily and economically, as India, now under the leadership of Indira Gandhi, was leaning towards Soviet Union. He considered Pakistan as a very important ally to counter Soviet influence in the Indian subcontinent and establish ties with China, with whom Pakistan was very close. The frosty personal relationship between Nixon and Indira further contributed to the poor relationship between the two nations. During the 1971 Indo-Pakistani War, the US openly supported Pakistan and deployed its aircraft carrier USS Enterprise towards the Bay of Bengal, which was seen as a show of force by the US in support of the West Pakistani forces. Later in 1974, India conducted its first nuclear test, Smiling Buddha, which was opposed by the US, however it also concluded that the test did not violate any agreement and proceeded with a June 1974 shipment of enriched uranium for the Tarapur reactor.

In the late 1970s, with the Janata Party leader Morarji Desai becoming the Prime Minister, India improved its relations with the US, led by Jimmy Carter, despite the latter signing an order in 1978 barring nuclear material from being exported to India due to India's non-proliferation record.

Despite the return of Indira Gandhi to power in 1980, the relations between the two countries continued to improve gradually, although India did not support the United States in its role in the Soviet invasion and occupation of Afghanistan. Indian foreign minister P. V. Narasimha Rao expressed "grave concern" over the United States's decision to "rearm" Pakistan; the two countries were working closely together to counter the Soviets in Afghanistan. The Reagan Administration led by US President Ronald Reagan provided limited assistance to India. India sounded out Washington on the purchase of a range of US defence technology, including F-5 aircraft, super computers, night vision goggles and radars. In 1984 Washington approved the supply of selected technology to India including gas turbines for naval frigates and engines for prototypes for India's light combat aircraft. There were also unpublicised transfers of technology, including the engagement of a US company, Continental Electronics, to design and build a new VLF communications station at Tirunelveli in Tamil Nadu, which was commissioned in the late 1980s.

Under Bill Clinton (President 1993–2001) and P. V. Narasimha Rao (Prime Minister 1991–1996) both sides mishandled relations, according to Arthur G. Rubinoff. Clinton simultaneously pressured India to liberalize its economy while criticizing New Delhi on human rights and nuclear issues. In the face of criticism from Washington and opposition at home, Indian leaders lost their enthusiasm for rapprochement and reverted to formalistic protocol over substantive diplomacy. The Brown Amendment that restored American aid to Pakistan in 1995 was an irritant.  In returning to a Cold War style rhetoric, Indian parliamentarians and American congressmen demonstrated their unwillingness to establish a new relationship.

NDA I and II governments (1998–2004) 

Soon after Atal Bihari Vajpayee became Indian Prime Minister, he authorised nuclear weapons testing at Pokhran. The United States strongly condemned this testing, promised sanctions, and voted in favour of a United Nations Security Council Resolution condemning the tests. President Bill Clinton imposed economic sanctions on India, including cutting off all military and economic aid, freezing loans by American banks to state-owned Indian companies, prohibiting loans to the Indian government for all except food purchases, prohibiting American aerospace technology and uranium exports to India, and requiring the US to oppose all loan requests by India to international lending agencies. However, these sanctions proved ineffective – India was experiencing a strong economic rise, and its trade with the US only constituted a small portion of its GDP. Only Japan joined the US in imposing direct sanctions, while most other nations continued to trade with India. The sanctions were soon lifted. Afterward, the Clinton administration and Prime Minister Vajpayee exchanged representatives to help rebuild relations.

India emerged in the 21st century as increasingly vital to core US foreign policy interests. India, a dominant actor in its region, and the home of more than one billion citizens, is now often characterised as a nascent Great Power and an "indispensable partner" of the US, one that many analysts view as a potential counterweight to the growing clout of China.

In March 2000, U.S. President Bill Clinton visited India, undertaking bilateral and economic discussions with Prime Minister Vajpayee. During the visit, the Indo-US Science & Technology Forum was established.

Over the course of improved diplomatic relations with the Bush Administration, India agreed to allow close international monitoring of its nuclear weapons development, although it has refused to give up its current nuclear arsenal. In 2004, the US decided to grant Major non-NATO ally (MNNA) status to Pakistan. The US extended the MNNA strategic working relationship to India but the offer was turned down.

After the September 11 attacks against the US in 2001, President George W. Bush collaborated closely with India in controlling and policing the strategically critical Indian Ocean sea lanes from the Suez Canal to Singapore.

UPA I & II governments (2004–2014) 
During the tenure of the George W. Bush administration, relations between India and the United States were seen to have blossomed, primarily over common concerns regarding growing Islamic extremism, energy security, and climate change. George W. Bush commented, "India is a great example of democracy. It is very devout, has diverse religious heads, but everyone is comfortable about their religion. The world needs India". Fareed Zakaria, in his book The Post-American World, described George W. Bush as "being the most pro-Indian president in American history." Similar sentiments are echoed by Rejaul Karim Laskar, a scholar of Indian foreign policy and ideologue of Indian National Congress – the largest constituent of the UPA. According to Laskar, the UPA rule has seen a "transformation in bilateral ties with the US", as a result of which the relations now covers "a wide range of issues, including high technology, space, education, agriculture, trade, clean energy, counter-terrorism, etc".

After the December 2004 tsunami, the US and Indian navies cooperated in search and rescue operations and in the reconstruction of affected areas.

Since 2004, Washington and New Delhi have been pursuing a "strategic partnership" that is based on shared values and generally convergent geopolitical interests. Numerous economic, security, and global initiatives – including plans for civilian nuclear cooperation – are underway. This latter initiative, first launched in 2005, reversed three decades of American non-proliferation policy. Also in 2005, United States and India signed a ten-year defense framework agreement, with the goal of expanding bilateral security cooperation. The two countries engaged in numerous and unprecedented combined military exercises, and major US arms sales to India were concluded. An Open Skies Agreement was signed in April 2005, enhancing trade, tourism, and business via the increased number of flights, and Air India purchased 68 US Boeing aircraft at a cost of $8 billion. The United States and India also signed a bilateral Agreement on Science and Technology Cooperation in 2005. After Hurricane Katrina, India donated $5 million to the American Red Cross and sent two planeloads of relief supplies and materials to help. Then, on 1 March 2006, President Bush made another diplomatic visit to further expand relations between India and the U.S.

The value of all bilateral trade tripled from 2004 to 2008 and continues to grow, while significant two-way investment also grows and flourishes.

The influence of a large Indian-American community is reflected in the largest country-specific caucus in the United States Congress, while between 2009 and 2010 more than 100,000 Indian students have attended American colleges and universities.

In November 2010, President Barack Obama visited India and addressed a joint session of the Indian Parliament, where he backed India's bid for a permanent seat on the United Nations Security Council.

Strategic and military determinants 

In March 2009, the Obama Administration cleared the US$2.1 billion sale of eight P-8 Poseidons to India. This deal, and the $5 billion agreement to provide Boeing C-17 military transport aircraft and General Electric F414 engines announced during Obama's November 2010 visit, makes the US one of the top three military suppliers to India (after Israel and Russia). Indians have raised concerns about contract clauses forbidding the offensive deployment of these systems. India is trying to resolve performance-related issues on the Boeing P-8I that have already been delivered to India.

US Chairman of the Joint Chiefs of Staff Mike Mullen has encouraged stronger military ties between India and the United States, and said that "India has emerged as an increasingly important strategic partner [of the US]". US Undersecretary of State William J. Burns also said, "Never has there been a moment when India and America mattered more to each other." The Deputy Secretary of Defence, Ashton Carter, during his address to the Asia Society in New York on August 1, 2012, said that India–US relationship has a global scope, in terms of the reach and influence of both countries. He also said that both countries are strengthening the relations between their defence and research organisations.

Revelations about US spying operations against India 

India, in July and November 2013, demanded that the US respond to allegations that the Indian UN mission in New York City and the Indian Embassy in Washington had been targeted for spying.

On 2 July 2014, U.S. diplomats were summoned by the Indian Ministry of External Affairs to discuss allegations that the National Security Agency had spied upon private individuals and political entities within India. A 2010 document leaked by Edward Snowden and published by the Washington Post revealed that US intelligence agencies had been authorized to spy on the Indian Prime Minister Narendra Modi (who was then the Chief Minister of Gujarat).

WikiLeaks revelations that Western intelligence agencies have used foreign aid workers and staff at non-governmental organizations as non-official cover prompted India to step-up the monitoring of satellite phones and movement of personnel working for humanitarian relief organisations and development aid agencies in the vicinity of sensitive locations.

Foreign policy issues 
According to some analysts, India–U.S. relations have been strained over the Obama administration's approach to Pakistan and the handling of the Taliban insurgency in Afghanistan. India's National Security Adviser, M. K. Narayanan, criticised the Obama administration for linking the Kashmir dispute to the instability in Pakistan and Afghanistan, and said that by doing so, President Obama was "barking up the wrong tree." Foreign Policy in February 2009 also criticised Obama's approach to South Asia, saying that "India can be a part of the solution rather than part of the problem" in South Asia. It also suggested that India take a more proactive role in rebuilding Afghanistan, irrespective of the attitude of the Obama Administration. In a clear indication of growing rift between the two countries, India decided not to accept a US invitation to attend a conference on Afghanistan at the end of February 2009. Bloomberg has also reported that, since the 2008 Mumbai attacks, the public mood in India has been to pressure Pakistan more aggressively to take actions against the culprits behind the terrorist attack, and that this might reflect on the upcoming Indian general elections in May 2009. Consequently, the Obama Administration may find itself at odds with India's rigid stance against terrorism.

India and US governments have differed on a variety of regional issues ranging from India's cordial relations with Iran and Russia to foreign policy disagreements relating to Sri Lanka, Maldives, Myanmar and Bangladesh.

Robert Blake, Assistant Secretary of State for South and Central Asian Affairs, dismissed any concerns over a rift with India regarding American AfPak policy. Calling India and the United States "natural allies", Blake said that the United States cannot afford to meet the strategic priorities in Pakistan and Afghanistan at "the expense of India".

India criticised the Obama Administration's decision to limit H-1B (temporary) visas, and India's then External Affairs Minister Pranab Mukherjee (later, the President of India until 2017) said that his country would oppose US "protectionism" at various international forums. India's Commerce Minister, Kamal Nath, said that India may move against Obama's outsourcing policies at the World Trade Organization. However, the outsourcing advisory head of KPMG said that India had no reason to worry, since Obama's statements were directed against "outsourcing being carried out by manufacturing companies" and not outsourcing of IT-related services.

In May 2009, Obama reiterated his anti-outsourcing views and criticised the current US tax policy "that says you should pay lower taxes if you create a job in Bangalore, India, than if you create one in Buffalo, New York." However, during the US India Business Council meeting in June 2009, U.S. Secretary of State Hillary Clinton advocated for stronger economic ties between India and the United States. She also rebuked protectionist policies, saying that "[United States] will not use the global financial crisis as an excuse to fall back on protectionism. We hope India will work with us to create a more open, equitable set of opportunities for trade between our nations."

In June 2010, the United States and India formally re-engaged the US-India Strategic Dialogue initiated under President Bush when a large delegation of high-ranking Indian officials, led by External Affairs Minister S.M. Krishna, visited Washington, D.C. As leader of the US delegation, Secretary of State Clinton lauded India as "an indispensable partner and a trusted friend". President Obama appeared briefly at a United States Department of State reception to declare his firm belief that America's relationship with India "will be one of the defining partnerships of the 21st century." The Strategic Dialogue produced a joint statement in which the two countries pledged to "deepen people-to-people, business-to-business, and government-to-government linkages ... for the mutual benefit of both countries and for the promotion of global peace, stability, economic growth and prosperity." It outlined extensive bilateral initiatives in ten key areas: (1) advancing global security and countering terrorism, (2) disarmament and nonproliferation, (3) trade and economic relations, (4) high technology, (5) energy security, clean energy, and climate change, (6) agriculture, (7) education, (8) health, (9) science and technology, and (10) development.

In November 2010, Obama became the second US President (after Richard Nixon in 1969) to undertake a visit to India in his first term in office. On 8 November, Obama also became the second US President (after Dwight D. Eisenhower in 1959) to ever address a joint session of the Parliament of India. In a major policy shift, Obama declared US support for India's permanent membership on the UN Security Council. Calling the India–U.S. relationship "a defining partnership of the 21st century", he also announced the removal of export control restrictions on several Indian companies, and concluded trade deals worth $10 billion, which are expected to create and/or support 50,000 jobs in the US.

Devyani Khobragade incident 

In December 2013, Devyani Khobragade, the Deputy Consul General of India in New York, was arrested and accused by U.S. federal prosecutors of submitting false work visa documents and paying her housekeeper "far less than the minimum legal wage." The ensuing incident caused protests from the Indian government and a rift in relations, with outrage expressed that Khobragade was strip-searched and held in the general inmate population. Former Prime Minister Manmohan Singh said that Khobragade's treatment was "deplorable".

India demanded an apology from the U.S. over her alleged "humiliation" and called for the charges to be dropped, which the U.S. declined to do. The Indian government retaliated for what it viewed as the mistreatment of its consular official by revoking the ID cards and other privileges of U.S. consular personnel and their families in India and removing security barriers in front of the U.S. Embassy in New Delhi.

The Indian government also blocked non-diplomats from using the American Community Support Association (ACSA) club and American Embassy Club in New Delhi, ordering these social clubs to cease all commercial activities benefiting non-diplomatic personnel by 16 January 2014. The ACSA club operates a bar, bowling alley, swimming pool, restaurant, video rentals club, indoor gym and a beauty parlour within the embassy premises. Tax-free import clearances given to US diplomats and consular officials for importing food, alcohol and other domestic items were revoked with immediate effect. U.S. embassy vehicles and staff were no longer immune from penalties for traffic violations. American diplomats were asked to show work contracts for all domestic help (cooks, gardeners, drivers and security staff) employed within their households. Indian authorities also conducted an investigation into the American Embassy School.

Khobragade was subject to prosecution at the time of her arrest because she had only consular immunity (which gives one immunity from prosecution only for acts committed in connection with official duties) and not the more extensive diplomatic immunity. After her arrest, the Indian government moved Khobragade to the Indian mission to the United Nations, upgrading her status and conferring diplomatic immunity on her; as a result, the federal indictment against Khobragade was dismissed in March 2014, although the door was left open to refiling of charges. A new indictment was filed against Khobragade, but by that point she had left the country. (In an effort to resolve the dispute, the U.S. State Department had told Khobragade to leave the country).

Nancy J. Powell, the U.S. ambassador to India, resigned following the incident, which was widely seen by India "as fallout from the imbroglio." Some commentators suggested that the incident and response could lead to wider damage in U.S.–India relations. Former Finance Minister Yashwant Sinha called for the arrest of same-sex companions of US diplomats, citing the Supreme Court of India's upholding of Section 377 of the Indian Penal Code whereby homosexuality is illegal in India. Former State Department legal advisor John Bellinger questioned whether the decision to arrest and detain Khobragade was "wise policy ... even if technically permissible" under the Vienna Convention on Consular Relations, while Robert D. Blackwill, the former U.S. ambassador to India from 2001 to 2003, said the incident was "stupid." Nevertheless, within a year of the incident, U.S.-India relations were warming again, as U.S. President Obama visited India in January 2015.

Speaking at Harvard Law School in 2014, the U.S. Attorney for the Southern District of New York, Preet Bharara, in the Khobragade case, said: "(It was) not the crime of the century but a serious crime nonetheless, that is why the State Department opened the case, that is why the State Department investigated it. That is why career agents in the State Department asked career prosecutors in my office to approve criminal charges." Bharara, who was born in India, said that he was upset by attacks on him in the Indian press.

Khobragade was originally a highly sympathetic figure in India, as Indians viewed her arrest as an affront to national dignity. Opinions in India shifted, however, after Khobragade was the subject of two inquiries by the Indian government. One internal investigation found that Khobragade had violated regulations "by failing to inform the government that her children had been issued American passports" and resulted in Khobragade being administratively disciplined; a second inquiry was held into Khobragade's series of interviews about the case, undertaken without authorization from the Ministry of External Affairs.

Relationship between US Government and Narendra Modi (2001–2014) 
Sectarian violence during the 2002 Gujarat riots damaged relations between the US Government and Narendra Modi, then incumbent Chief Minister of Gujarat. Human rights activists accused Modi of fostering anti-Muslim violence. New-York based non-governmental organization Human Rights Watch, in their 2002 report directly implicated Gujarat state officials in the violence against Muslims.

In 2012, a Special Investigation Team (SIT) appointed by the Indian Supreme Court found no "prosecutable evidence" against Modi. The Supreme Court of India absolved Narendra Modi of any criminal wrongdoing during the 2002 Gujarat riots.

In 2005, the US Department of State used a 1998 International Religious Freedom Act (IRFA) provision to revoke Modi's tourist/business visa citing section 212 (a) (2) (g) of the US Immigration and Nationality Act. The IRFA provision "makes any foreign government official who 'was responsible for or directly carried out, at any time, particularly severe violations of religious freedom' ineligible for a visa to the United States."

David C. Mulford, the US Ambassador to India from 2003 to 2009, justified the rejection of a diplomatic visa to Modi in a statement released on 21 March 2005 stating that the US State Department re-affirmed the original decision to revoke Modi's tourist/business visa to which India's highest judiciary abstained all the charges from Modi later on the particular issue:

"This decision applies to Mr. Narendra Modi only. It is based on the fact that, as head of the State government in Gujarat between February 2002 and May 2002, he was responsible for the performance of state institutions at that time. The State Department's detailed views on this matter are included in its annual Country Reports on Human Rights Practices and the International Religious Freedom Report. Both reports document the violence in Gujarat from February 2002 to May 2002 and cite the Indian National Human Rights Commission report, which states there was "a comprehensive failure on the part of the state government to control the persistent violation of rights of life, liberty, equality, and dignity of the people of the state."

Prior to Narendra Modi becoming the Prime Minister of India, the US Government had made it known that Modi as Chief Minister of Gujarat would not be permitted to travel to the US. Michael Kugelman of the Wilson Center opined that although technically speaking there was no US 'visa ban' from 2005 to 2014, the US government policy of considering Modi as persona non grata had resulted in a de facto travel-ban. After the US revoked his existing B1/B2 visa in 2005 and refused to accept his application for an A2 visa, the US State Department affirmed that the visa policy remained unchanged : "(Mr Modi) is welcome to apply for a visa and await a review like any other applicant".

Exploring opportunities on how to move the relationship out of a state of morose, Lisa Curtis, senior research fellow for South Asia in the Asian Studies Center of the Heritage Foundation, says that "the U.S. must first signal its willingness and commitment to collaborating with the new government—and that it will not dwell on the controversy of the 2002 Gujarat riots, which led the U.S. to revoke Modi's visa in 2005."

In 2009, the US Commission for International Religious Freedom (USCIRF) report after ignoring the views and decision of independent body (SIT) set up by India's highest judiciary vehemently alleged that there was "significant evidence" linking Narendra Modi to communal riots in the state in 2002 and asked the Obama administration to continue the policy of preventing him from travelling to the United States of America .

The Obama administration maintained the 2005 decision taken by the George W. Bush administration to deny Narendra Modi entry into the United States of America. The US Government says that Modi can circumvent the USCIRF sanctions regime by visiting Washington on a Heads of government A1-visa as long as he is the Prime Minister of India. According to US State Department Spokesperson, Jen Psaki : "US law exempts foreign government officials, including heads of state and heads of government from certain potential inadmissibility grounds". The visa refusal came after some Indian-American groups and human rights organizations with political view campaigned against Modi, including the Coalition Against Genocide.

On 11 June 2014, Robert Blackwill, the former Coordinator for Strategic Planning and Deputy US National Security Advisor during the presidency of George W. Bush, spoke at length about India–U.S. relations and said : "Mr Modi is a determined leader. He is candid and frank. I also worked with him during the Gujarat earthquake when I was posted as (the US) ambassador to India. ... It was mistake by the current Obama administration to delay engagement with Mr Modi. I do not know why they did so but definitely, this did not help in building relationship. ... The old formula and stereotypes will not work if the US administration wants to engage with Mr Modi. The Indian prime minister is candid, direct and smart. He speaks his mind. The US administration also has to engage in candid conversation when Mr Modi meets President Obama later this year. They have to do something innovative to engage with him."

Nicholas Burns, former U.S. Undersecretary of State for Political Affairs from 2005 to 2008, has spoken about the visa denial by saying: "Bush administration officials, including me, believed this to be the right decision at the time." and has opined that "Now that it looks like Modi will become prime minister, it's reasonable for the Obama administration to say it's been 12 years [since the 2002 riots], and we'll be happy to deal with him"

NDA government (2014–present) 

India–United States relations have improved significantly during the Premiership of Narendra Modi since 2014. At present, India and the US share an extensive and expanding cultural, strategic, military, and economic relationship which is in the phase of implementing confidence building measures (CBM) to overcome the legacy of trust deficit – brought about by adversarial US foreign policies and multiple instances of technology denial – which have plagued the relationship over several decades. Unrealistic expectations after the conclusion of the 2008 U.S.–India Civil Nuclear Agreement (which underestimated negative public opinion regarding the long-term viability of nuclear power generation and civil-society endorsement for contractual guarantees on safeguards and liability) has given way to pragmatic realism and refocus on areas of cooperation which enjoy favourable political and electoral consensus.

Key recent developments include the rapid growth of India's economy, closer ties between the Indian and American industries especially in the Information and communications technology (ICT), engineering and medical sectors, an informal entente to manage an increasingly assertive China, robust cooperation on counter-terrorism, the deterioration of U.S.-Pakistan relations, easing of export controls over dual-use goods & technologies (99% of licenses applied for are now approved), and reversal of long-standing American opposition to India's strategic program.

Income creation in the USA through knowledge-based employment by Asian Indians has outpaced every other ethnic group according to U.S. Census data. Growing financial and political clout of the affluent Asian Indian diaspora is noteworthy. Indian American households are the most prosperous in the US with a median revenue of US$100,000 and are  followed by Chinese Americans at US$65,000. The average household revenue in the USA is US$63,000.

The US and India continue to differ on issues ranging from trade to civil liberties. The Indian Home Ministry, through an affidavit submitted to the Delhi High Court on 13 February 2015, claimed that Country Reports on Rights & Practices have become instruments of foreign policy: "The US, UK and EU have clearly mentioned in government documents and pronouncements that these reports are made for the purpose of their being used as instruments of foreign policy." The affidavit also claimed that the reports by US, UK and European Parliament were biased since they "do not provide opportunity to the Government of India or the local embassy/high commission to record their opinion and are heavily biased against the targeted country". The 2014 State Department's annual Trafficking in Persons (TIP) report appeared to classify the Khobragade incident as an example of human trafficking, stating: "An Indian consular officer at the New York consulate was indicted in December 2013 for visa fraud related to her alleged exploitation of an Indian domestic worker." In response, India has shown no urgency to allow visits to India by the newly appointed US anti-human trafficking ambassador Susan P. Coppedge and the US special envoy for LGBT rights Randy Berry. Under Section 377 of the Indian Penal Code homosexuality was illegal in India. Indian Ambassador to the US, Arun K. Singh reiterated India's commitment to work within an international framework to tackle the problem of trafficking but rejected any "unilateral assessments" by another country saying "We will never accept it" and downplayed the importance of the visits: "When you ask a U.S. official when somebody will be given a visa, they always say 'we will assess when visa is applied for.' ... I can do no better than to reiterate the U.S. position."

In February 2016, the Obama administration notified the US Congress that it intended to provide Pakistan eight nuclear-capable F-16 fighters and assorted military goods including eight AN/APG-68(V)9 airborne radars and eight ALQ-211(V)9 electronic warfare suites despite strong reservations from US lawmakers regarding the transfer of any nuclear weapons capable platforms to Pakistan. Shashi Tharoor, an elected representative from the Congress party in India, questioned the substance of India–U.S. ties: "I am very disappointed to hear this news. The truth is that continuing to escalate the quality of arms available to an irresponsible regime that has sent terrorists to India, and in the name of anti-terrorism, is cynicism of the highest order". The Indian Government summoned the US Ambassador to India to convey its disapproval regarding the sale of F-16 fighter jets to Pakistan.

Relationship under President Trump (2017-2021) 

In February 2017, Indian ambassador to the U.S. Navtej Sarna hosted a reception for the National Governors Association (NGA), which was attended by the Governors of 25 states and senior representatives of 3 more states. This was the first time such an event has occurred. Explaining the reason for the gathering, Virginia Governor and NGA Chair Terry McAuliffe stated that "India is America's greatest strategic partner". He further added, "We clearly understand the strategic importance of India, of India–U.S. relations. As we grow our 21st century economy, India has been so instrumental in helping us build our technology, medical professions. We recognise a country that has been such a close strategic ally of the US. That's why we the Governors are here tonight." McAuliffe, who has visited India 15 times, also urged other Governors to visit the country with trade delegations to take advantage of opportunities.

In October 2018, India inked the historic agreement worth US$5.43 billion  with Russia to procure four S-400 Triumf surface-to-air missile defence system, one of the most powerful missile defence systems in the world ignoring America's CAATSA act. The U.S. threatened India with sanctions over India's decision to buy the S-400 missile defense system from Russia. The United States also threatened India with sanctions over India's decision to buy oil from Iran. According to the President of the U.S.-India Strategic Partnership Forum (USISPF), Mukesh Aghi: "sanctions would have a disastrous effect on U.S.-India relations for decades to come. In India’s eyes, the United States would once again be regarded as untrustworthy."

The Trump administration has grown closer to India, which shares the same right wing views, and Trump has repeatedly praised Modi's leadership while ignoring disputes over citizenship and Kashmir.

In early 2020, India provided its agreement for terminating an export embargo on a medicinal drug known as hydroxychloroquine amidst the combat against the ongoing coronavirus (COVID-19) pandemic, after Trump threatened retaliation against India, if it did not comply with terminating the export embargo on hydroxychloroquine.

In June 2020, during the George Floyd protests, the Mahatma Gandhi Memorial in Washington, D.C. was vandalised by unknown miscreants on the intervening night of June 2 and 3. The incident prompted the Indian Embassy to register a complaint with law enforcement agencies. Taranjit Singh Sandhu, the Indian Ambassador to the United States called the vandalism "a crime against humanity". U.S. President Donald Trump called the defacement of Mahatma Gandhi's statue a "disgrace".

On 21 December 2020, President of the United States Donald Trump awarded Modi with the Legion of Merit for elevating India–United States relations. The Legion of Merit was awarded to Modi along with Prime Minister of Australia Scott Morrison and former Prime Minister of Japan Shinzo Abe, the "original architects" of the QUAD.

In 2018, a UAE princess, a US-French dual national and others were arrested by Indian and UAE soldiers in the Arabian sea, a few kilometres off the coast of India. The princess, Latifa bin Mohammed Al Maktoum was then sent back to Dubai. She wanted to escape the oppressive UAE. After the incident, there was a lot of criticism.

Modi–Biden relationship (2021 onwards)
US-India ties began to strain in April 2021 when India faced a massive spike in COVID-19 infections. The US had invoked the Defense Production Act of 1950 to ban the export of raw materials needed to produce vaccines in order to prioritize domestic vaccine production. According to The Times of India, this also caused an explosion of anti-US sentiment in India, as the U.S. had vaccine reserves and refused to share COVID-19 vaccine patents. This came after a plea by Adar Poonawalla, CEO of the Serum Institute of India, to lift the embargo on export of raw materials needed to ramp up production of COVID-19 vaccines, was rejected. However, in late April, right after a phone call with Ajit Doval, the National Security Advisor of India, the Biden administration stated it would make raw materials necessary for production of the Oxford–AstraZeneca COVID-19 vaccine available to India, and began to send more than  worth of drug treatments, rapid diagnostic tests, ventilators, personal protective equipment, and mechanical parts needed to manufacture vaccines to India, along with a team of public health experts from the United States Centers for Disease Control and Prevention. The US also stated that it planned to finance the expansion of Biological E. Limited, an Indian-based COVID-19 vaccine production company. India entered negotiations with the US after it declared that it would share 60 million Oxford-AstraZeneca vaccines with the world.

USS John Paul Jones intrusion 

On April 7, 2021, The United States Navy guided missile destroyer USS John Paul Jones sailed through India's Exclusive Economic Zone, without New Delhi's prior consent, then publicly announced the event, causing a diplomatic spat. At a time when the United States and India had been deepening relations, such a move had raised eyebrows among the general public in both India and the United States. As per the official statement by the United States Navy's 7th Fleet, "On April 7, 2021 (local time) USS John Paul Jones (DDG 53) asserted navigational rights and freedoms approximately 130 nautical miles west of the Lakshadweep Islands, inside India’s exclusive economic zone, without requesting India’s prior consent, consistent with international law". India requires prior consent for military exercises or maneuvers in its exclusive economic zone or continental shelf, a claim inconsistent with international law. This freedom of navigation operation ("FONOP") upheld the rights, freedoms, and lawful uses of the sea recognized in international law by challenging India's excessive maritime claims. The Statement further added, "U.S. Forces operate in the Indo-Pacific region on a daily basis. All operations are designed in accordance with international law and demonstrate that the United States will fly, sail and operate wherever international law allows." The Pentagon defended the 7th Fleet's statement by claiming that the event was consistent with international law.

The Indian Ministry of External Affairs released its statement after much media attention, the statement said, "The Government of India's stated position on the United Nations Convention on the Law of the Sea is that the Convention does not authorize other States to carry out in the Exclusive Economic Zone and on the continental shelf, military exercises or maneuvers, in particular those involving the use of weapons or explosives, without the consent of the coastal state", it further added, "The USS John Paul Jones was continuously monitored transiting from the Persian Gulf towards the Malacca Straits. We have conveyed our concerns regarding this passage through our EEZ to the Government of USA through diplomatic channels."Former Chief of Naval Staff of the Indian Navy, Admiral Arun Prakash, commented on the event by tweeting "There is irony here. While India ratified [the] UN Law of the Seas in 1995, the US has failed to do it so far. For the 7th Fleet to carry out FoN missions in Indian EEZ in violation of our domestic law is bad enough. But publicizing it? USN please switch on IFF!". He further tweeted, "FoN ops by USN ships (ineffective as they may be) in South China Sea, are meant to convey a message to China that the putative EEZ around the artificial SCS islands is an 'excessive maritime claim.' But what is the 7th Fleet message for India?"

State Visits by counterparts (2014 onwards)

Modi's visit to America, 2014 
During the run-off to the 2014 Indian general election, there was wide-ranging scepticism regarding the future of the India–U.S. strategic relationship. Narendra Modi, whose US visa had been revoked while he was the Chief Minister of Gujarat, had been boycotted by US officials for almost a decade for his alleged role in the 2002 Gujarat riots. However, sensing Modi's inevitable victory well before the election, the US Ambassabor Nancy Powell had reached out to him. Moreover, following his 2014 election as the Prime Minister of India President Obama congratulated him over telephone and invited him to visit the US. US Secretary of State John Kerry visited New Delhi on 1 August to prepare the grounds for Modi's first ever US visit as Prime Minister. In September 2014, days  before visiting the US in an interview to CNN's Fareed Zakaria, Modi said that "India and the United States are bound together, by history and culture" but acknowledged that there have been "ups and downs" in relations. Modi travelled to US from 27 to 30 September 2014, beginning with his maiden address in the United Nations general assembly followed by attending a gala public reception by the Indian American community in New York's Madison Square Garden before heading Washington, D.C. for the bilateral talk with Obama. While there, Modi also met several American business leaders and invited them to join his ambitious Make in India program in a bid to make India a manufacturing hub.

Obama's visit to India, 2015 
President Barack Obama became the first US president to be the chief guest of the 66th Republic Day celebrations of India held on 26 January 2015. India and the US held their first ever bilateral dialogue on the UN and multilateral issues in the spirit of the "Delhi Declaration of Friendship" that strengthens and expands the two countries' relationship as part of the Post-2015 Development Agenda.The conspicuous absence of major announcements, a key indicator of the state of US relations with the host country, led political commentators in both countries to highlight the confidence-building aspects of the visit

Modi's visit to America, 2015 
Prime Minister Narendra Modi toured the Silicon Valley and met with entrepreneurs – several of whom are persons of Indian origin – involved in successful microelectronics, digital communications and biotechnology start-ups to promote the NDA government's Make in India initiative. Modi left the U.S. West Coast and travelled to New York for the 2015 UN General Assembly meeting where he had bilateral discussions with US President Barack Obama.

Modi's visit to America, 2016 
Prime Minister Narendra Modi while visiting the United States addressed a joint session of Congress highlighting the common traits of both democracies and long-term friendship between the two countries. In a speech lasting more than 45 minutes, Mr. Modi drew on parallels between the two countries and addressed a variety of issues where the two countries have worked together in the past and where the future course of action would lie.

Modi's visit to America, 2017 
On June 26, 2017, Prime Minister Narendra Modi visited the United States and met US President Donald Trump. On 8 November 2017, the US announced a grant of nearly US$500,000 for organisations which came up with ideas and projects to promote religious freedom in India and Sri Lanka.

Modi's visit to America, 2019 

In September 2019, Modi visited Houston and he addressed a large Indian American contingent in the Houston NRG stadium. Along with President Trump, he reaffirmed Indian American ties, with an emphasis on increased military cooperation with the initiation of the Tiger Triumph exercises.

Trump's visit to India, 2020 

On February 24, 2020, Trump visited Ahmedabad, Gujarat to address a large Indian crowd. The event, titled "Namaste Trump", was a response to the "Howdy Modi" event held in 2019. Attendance of over 100,000 people was reported. The event served as a platform for the U.S. president and the Indian prime minister to show off their friendly relationship.

Trump also visited Agra, Uttar Pradesh and the Taj Mahal on the same day. In Agra, the Chief Minister of Uttar Pradesh, Yogi Adityanath welcomed the President and the First Lady. There were 3000 cultural artists showcasing art, cultural & music of various regions. However, political commentators state that Trump's first official visit to India had been overshadowed by the 2020 North East Delhi riots.

Modi's visit to America, 2021 
Modi travelled to US from 22 to 25 September 2021, beginning with his maiden address in the United Nations general assembly before heading Washington, D.C. for the bilateral talk with President Joe Biden and Vice President Kamala Harris. While there, Modi also participated in the Quad Leaders' Summit.

Military relations 

The U.S. has four "foundational" agreements that it signs with its defence partners. The Pentagon describes the agreements as "routine instruments that the U.S. uses to promote military cooperation with partner-nations". American officials have stated that the agreements are not prerequisites for bilateral defence co-operation, but would make it simpler and more cost-effective to carry out activities such as refueling aircraft or ships in each other's countries and providing disaster relief. The first of the four agreements, the General Security Of Military Information Agreement (GSOMIA), was signed by India and the U.S. in 2002. The agreement enables the sharing of military intelligence between the two countries and requires each country to protect the others' classified information. The second agreement, the Logistics Exchange Memorandum of Agreement (LEMOA), was signed by the two countries on 29 August 2016. The LEMOA permits the military of either country to use the others' bases for re-supplying or carrying out repairs. The agreement does not make the provision of logistical support binding on either country, and requires individual clearance for each request. The third agreement, Communications Compatibility and Security Agreement (COMCASA) was signed during the inaugural 2+2 dialogue in September 2018. It is an India-specific variant of Communications and Information Security Memorandum of Agreement (CISMOA) that enables the two countries to share secure communication and exchange information on approved equipment during bilateral and multinational training exercises and operations. The fourth agreement, the Basic Exchange and Cooperation Agreement (BECA), signed in 2020, permits the exchange of unclassified and controlled unclassified geospatial products, topographical, nautical, and aeronautical data, products and services between India and the US National Geospatial-Intelligence Agency (NGA).

Harsh V. Pant, professor of International relations at King's College London, highlighted the importance of India to US strategic planning by saying: "India is key to the US' ability to create a stable balance of power in the larger Indo-Pacific and at a time of resource constraints, it needs partners like India to shore up its sagging credibility in the region in face of Chinese onslaught." Robert Boggs, professor of South Asia Studies at the Near East South Asia Center for Strategic Studies, opines that the US "overestimates both India's desire to improve the relationship and the benefits doing so would bring".

As part of America's policies to counter China, one of the Trump administration policies are to make India as one of the major defence partners for which it is in talks with Indian representatives to sell highly technologically advanced predator drones. India has floated a tender to buy 100 multi role fighter aircraft in the Indian MRCA competition (also called Mother of all defence deals), worth around US$15 billion  under Narendra Modi's Make in India initiative. Although the deal is yet to be finalised in 2018, Present USA Trump's administration is now pushing for sales of advanced F-16 jet fighters, and F/A-18 Super Hornet

In a meeting between President George W. Bush and Prime Minister Atal Bihari Vajpayee in November 2001, the two leaders expressed a strong interest in transforming the US-India bilateral relationship. High-level meetings and concrete cooperation between the two countries increased during 2002 and 2003. In January 2004, the US and India launched the "Next Steps in Strategic Partnership" (NSSP), which was both a milestone in the transformation of the bilateral relationship and a blueprint for its further progress. The Indian Army and US Army conducts an annual training practice called Yudh Abhyas since 2002. In 2022, this exercise was conducted in Uttarakhand. 

In July 2005, Bush hosted Prime Minister Manmohan Singh in Washington, D.C. The two leaders announced the successful completion of the NSSP, as well as other agreements which further enhanced cooperation in the areas of civil nuclear, civil space, and high-technology commerce. Other initiatives announced included a US-India economic dialogue, the fight Against HIV/AIDS, disaster relief, technology cooperation, an agriculture knowledge initiative, a trade policy forum, energy dialogue, CEO Forum, and an initiative to assist each other in furthering democracy and freedom. President Bush made a reciprocal visit to India in March 2006, during which the progress of these initiatives were reviewed, and new initiatives were launched.

In June 2015, US defence secretary Ashton Carter visited India and became the first American defence secretary to visit an Indian military command. In December of the same year, Manohar Parrikar became the first Indian defence minister to visit the US Pacific Command.

In March 2016, India rejected a proposal by the US to join naval patrols in the South China Sea alongside Japan and Australia. Defense Minister Manohar Parrikar said: "India has never taken part in any joint patrol; we only do joint exercises. The question of joint patrol does not arise."

In January 2017, Peter Lavoy, Senior Director for South Asian Affairs at the U.S. National Security Council, declared that the partnership between India and the United States under Barack Obama's administration had been "incredibly successful". Lavoy stated, "I can tell you quite definitively that due to our partnerships, several terrorism plots were foiled. Indian lives and American lives were saved because of this partnership."

On 27 October 2020, the United States and India signed the Basic Exchange and Cooperation Agreement (BECA), enabling greater information-sharing and further defense cooperation, to counter China's growing military power in the region. During the 2+2 ministerial dialogue the last agreement of four so-called “foundational agreements” for sharing sensitive information and sales of advanced military hardware.

On 16 August 2022, US Air Force Secretary Frank Kendall said that Indian defence attaché now has unescorted access to The Pentagon and he also added that this is commencement with our close relationship with India's status as a major defense partner," and future added that "And if you don't think unescorted access to the Pentagon is a big deal, I can't get into The Pentagon without an escort,".

Nuclear Cooperation

Pokhran Tests 

In 1998, India tested nuclear weapons which resulted in several US, Japanese and European sanctions on India. India's then defence minister, George Fernandes, said that India's nuclear programme was necessary as it provided a deterrence to potential nuclear threats. Most of the sanctions imposed on India were removed by 2001. India has categorically stated that it will never use weapons first but will retaliate if attacked.

The economic sanctions imposed by the United States in response to India's nuclear tests in May 1998 appeared, at least initially, to seriously damage India-US relations. President Bill Clinton imposed wide-ranging sanctions pursuant to the 1994 Nuclear Proliferation Prevention Act. US sanctions on Indian entities involved in the nuclear industry and opposition to international financial institution loans for non-humanitarian assistance projects in India. The United States encouraged India to sign the Comprehensive Nuclear-Test-Ban Treaty (CTBT) immediately and without condition. The United States also called for restraint in missile and nuclear testing and deployment by both India and Pakistan. The non-proliferation dialogue initiated after the 1998 nuclear tests has bridged many of the gaps in understanding between the countries.

Easing of Tension 

In late September 2001, President Bush lifted sanctions imposed under the terms of the 1994 Nuclear Proliferation Prevention Act following India's nuclear tests in May 1998. A succession of non-proliferation dialogues bridged many of the gaps in understanding between the countries.

In December 2006, the US Congress passed the historic India–United States Civilian Nuclear Agreement|Henry J. Hyde US–India Peaceful Atomic Cooperation Act, which allows direct civilian nuclear commerce with India for the first time in 30 years. US policy had been opposed to nuclear cooperation with India in prior years because India had developed nuclear weapons against international conventions, and had never signed the Nuclear Non-Proliferation Treaty (NNPT). The legislation clears the way for India to buy US nuclear reactors and fuel for civilian use.

The India–United States Civil Nuclear Agreement also referred to as the "123 Agreement", signed on 10 October 2008 is a bilateral agreement for peaceful nuclear cooperation which governs civil nuclear trade between American and Indian firms to participate in each other's civil nuclear energy sector. For the agreement to be operational, nuclear vendors and operators must comply with India's 2010 Nuclear Liability Act which stipulates that nuclear suppliers, contractors and operators must bear financial responsibility in case of an accident.

Prominent industrial accidents (1984 Bhopal chemical-gas disaster and the 2011 Fukushima nuclear disaster) have led to greater scrutiny by civil society into corporate responsibility and financial liability obligations of vendors and operators of critical infrastructure. In 2010, the Indian Parliament voted to pass the Civil Liability for Nuclear Damage Act to address concerns and provide civil liability for nuclear damage and prompt compensation to the victims of a nuclear incident.

On 27 March 2019, India and the US signed an agreement to "strengthen bilateral security and civil nuclear cooperation" including the construction of six American nuclear reactors in India.

Post–September 11

India's contribution to the War on Terror has helped India's diplomatic relations with several countries. Over the past few years, India has held numerous joint military exercises with United States and European nations that have resulted in a strengthened US-India and EU-India bilateral relationship. India's bilateral trade with Europe and US has more than doubled in the last five years.

However, India has not signed the CTBT, or the Nuclear Non-Proliferation Treaty, claiming the discriminatory nature of the treaty that allows the five declared nuclear countries of the world to keep their nuclear arsenal and develop it using computer simulation testing. Prior to its nuclear testing, India had pressed for a comprehensive destruction of nuclear weapons by all countries of the world in a time-bound frame. This was not favoured by the United States and by certain other countries. Presently, India has declared its policy of "no-first use of nuclear weapons" and the maintenance of a "credible nuclear deterrence". The USA, under President George W. Bush has also lifted most of its sanctions on India and has resumed military co-operation. Relations with USA have considerably improved in the recent years, with the two countries taking part in joint naval exercises off the coast of India and joint air exercises both in India as well as in the United States.

India has been pushing for reforms in the United Nations and in the World Trade Organization with mixed results. India's candidature for a permanent seat at the UN Security Council is currently backed by several countries including Russia, United Kingdom, France, Germany, Japan, Brazil, African Union nations and United States. In 2005, the United States signed a nuclear co-operation agreement with India even though the latter is not a part of the Nuclear Non-Proliferation Treaty. The United States agreed that India's strong nuclear non-proliferation record made it an exception and persuaded other Nuclear Suppliers Group members to sign similar deals with India.

On 2 March 2006 India and the United States signed the Indo-US Nuclear Pact on co-operation in civilian nuclear field. This was signed during the four days state visit of USA President George Bush in India. On its part, India would separate its civilian and military nuclear programmes, and the civilian programmes would be brought under the safeguards of International Atomic Energy Agency (IAEA). The United States would sell India the reactor technologies and the nuclear fuel for setting up and upgrading its civilian nuclear programme. The US Congress needs to ratify this pact since US federal law prohibits the trading of nuclear technologies and materials outside the framework of the Nuclear Suppliers Group (NSG).

Economic relations 
The United States is one of India's largest direct investors. From 1991 to 2004, the stock of FDI inflow has increased from US$11 million to $344.4 million, and totaling $4.13 billion. This is a compound rate increase of 57.5 percent annually. Indian direct investments abroad began in 1992, and Indian corporations and registered partnership firms now can and do invest in businesses up to 100 percent of their net worth. India's largest outgoing investments are in the manufacturing sector, which accounts for 54.8 percent of the country's foreign investments. The second largest are in non-financial services (software development), accounting for 35.4 percent of investments.

Trade relations 

The US is India's largest trading partner since 2021, and India is its 7th largest trading partner. In 2017, the US exported $25.7 billion worth of goods to India, and imported $48.6 billion worth of Indian goods. Major items imported from India include information technology services, textiles, machinery, gems and diamonds, chemicals, iron and steel products, coffee, tea, and other edible food products. Major American items imported by India include aircraft, fertilisers, computer hardware, scrap metal, and medical equipment.

The United States is also India's largest investment partner, with a direct investment of $10 billion (accounting for 9 percent of total foreign investment). Americans have made notable foreign investments in the Asian country's power generation, telecommunications, ports, roads, petroleum exploration and processing, and mining industries.

American imports from India amounted to $46.6 billion or 2% of its overall imports, and 15.3% of India's overall exports in 2015. The 10 major commodities exported from India to the US were:

 Gems, precious metals and coins ($9.5 billion)
 Pharmaceuticals ($6.1 billion)
 Oil ($2.8 billion)
 Machinery: $2.5 billion
 Other textiles, worn clothing: $2.5 billion
 Clothing (not knit or crochet): $2.2 billion
 Organic chemicals: $2.1 billion
 Knit or crochet clothing: $1.7 billion
 Vehicles: $1.4 billion
 Iron or steel products: $1.3 billion

American exports to India amounted to $20.5 billion or 5.2% of India's overall imports in 2015. The 10 major commodities exported from the US to India were:

 Gems, precious metals and coins ($3.4 billion)
 Machinery: $3 billion
 Electronic equipment: $1.6 billion
 Medical, technical equipment: $1.4 billion
 Oil: $1.3 billion
 Aircraft, spacecraft: $1.1 billion
 Plastics: $815.9 million
 Organic chemicals: $799.4 million
 Other chemical goods: $769.1 million
 Fruits, nuts: $684.7 million

In July 2005, President Bush and Prime Minister Manmohan Singh created a new programme called the Trade Policy Forum. It is run by a representative from each nation. The United States Trade Representative was Rob Portman, and the Indian Commerce Secretary then-Minister of Commerce Kamal Nath. The goal of the programme is to increase bilateral trade and investment flow. There are five main sub-divisions of the Trade Policy Forum, including:

The Agricultural Trade group has three main objectives: agreeing on terms that will allow India to export mangoes to the United States, permitting India's Agricultural and Process Food Products Export Development Authority (APEDA) to certify Indian products to the standards of the U.S. Department of Agriculture, and executing regulation procedures for approving edible wax on fruit.
The goals of the Tariff and Non-Tariff Barriers group include agreeing that insecticides manufactured by US companies can be sold throughout India. India had also agreed to cut special regulations on trading carbonated drinks, many medicinal drugs, and lowering regulations on many imports that are not of an agricultural nature. Both nations have agreed to discuss improved facets of Indian regulation in the trade of jewellery, computer parts, motorcycles, fertiliser, and those tariffs that affect American exporting of boric acid. The group has also discussed matters such as those wishing to break into the accounting market, Indian companies gaining licenses for the telecommunications industry, and setting policies regarding Indian media and broadcasting markets. Other foci include the exchange of valuable information on recognizing different professional services, discussing the movement and positioning of people in developing industries, continuation of talks on financial services markets, limitation of equities, insurance, retail, joint investment in agricultural processing and transportation industries, and small business initiatives.

On 3 August 2018, India became the third Asian nation to be granted Strategic Trade Authorization-1 (STA-1) status by the United States. STA-1 enables the export of high-technology products in civil space and defence from the US to India.

On 15th of February 2023, Air India announced an order of 470 jets, out of which 220 jets would be bought from Boeing and the other 250 from Airbus. This is one of the biggest aircraft orders in the commercial jet industry. The deal was acknowledged by both the POTUS and the PMO of India.

Science and technology 

On 31 January 2023, the US-India Civil Space Joint Working Group (CSJWG) met for the eighth time. The group is a collaboration of space agencies ISRO and NASA. The CSJWG has planned to launch The NASA-ISRO Synthetic Aperture Radar (NISAR) mission in 2024 which is expected to map Earth using two different radar frequencies to monitor resources like water, forests, and agriculture.

On January 2023, the national security advisors of India and the U.S. announced the launch of the U.S.-India Initiative on Critical and Emerging Technologies (iCET). Under iCET, both sides will work together in the fields of artificial intelligence, quantum technologies, advanced wireless technology, space and semiconductor supply chain resilience.

India-US strategic partnership 

India-US relations got strategic content in the early 1960s. The rise of the People's Republic of China worried the policymakers in Washington. Chinese assertion in Tibet, its role in the Korean War and other such acts concerned Washington. As the relations between India and China were heated during the late fifties, the Americans found a golden opportunity to take advantage of this situation to promote India as a counterweight to China. 

After the end of the Cold War, Indian and American interests converged in a number of areas, including counter-terrorism, promotion of democracy, counter-proliferation, freedom of navigation in the Indian Ocean, and the balance of power in Asia.

As the world's oldest and largest democracies, respectively, the U.S. and India share historic ties. India is a founding member of the "Community of Democracies"—a prominent endeavor of the United States on promotion of democracy. However, the India rejected the suggestion of the USA about setting up a Centre for Asian Democracy.

Indian Prime Minister Manmohan Singh was the guest of honour at the first state dinner, which took place on 24 November 2009, of the administration of US President Barack Obama. Obama later visited India from 6–9 November 2010, signing numerous trade and defence agreements with India. He addressed the joint session of the Indian parliament in New Delhi, becoming only the second US president to do so, and announced that the United States would lend its support to India's bid for a permanent seat in the United Nations Security Council, signifying the growing strategic dimension of the relationship between the world's two largest democracies. During US President Trump's visit to India in 2020, both sides agree to establish “Comprehensive Global Strategic Partnership”.

Whether it's the 2017 Doklam standoff or the 2020–2021 China–India skirmishes, the United States provided India with intelligence it possessed, and the two sides discussed the crisis near Ladakh. The US was also involved in securing the release of Indian pilot Abhinandan Varthaman from Pakistani custody following the 2019 Balakot airstrike. The US played role in extinguishing tensions between India and Pakistan in 2019, when Pakistan and India were at verge of nuclear war, as per claim of former US secretary of state Mike Pompeo.

On 27 October 2020, US-India signed a military agreement on sharing sensitive satellite data. The Basic Exchange and Cooperation Agreement, or BECA, allows US's strategic partners to access a range of sensitive geospatial and aeronautical data which is useful for military actions.

In December 2020, US India Business Council president Nisha Desai Biswal claimed that the ties between the two nations will continue and grow stronger in 2021, as the Biden administration will prioritize their trade deals for a prospering economic relationship.

Tensions over Russian relations

The purchase of S-400 missile system by India, resulted in an imbroglio in the US Congress. Previously, the Trump administration admonished India that it might entice economic sanctions by the United States. But since India looms as a counterweight to China, the significance of India is creeping upon the US Senate. Following that, two major Senators John Cornyn from the Republican Party and Mark Warner from the Democratic Party urged president Joe Biden to waive sanctions against New Delhi as it might euthanize the cumulative cooperation with India to maintain the hegemony of the United States of America across the region of South Asia & the Indian Ocean region.

Following the 2022 Russian invasion of Ukraine, India abstained on a United Nations resolution showing disapproval of (but not politically condemning) the invasion, saying it was "deeply disturbed" by Russia's invasion. Some experts have also pointed out that the reason for India's abstention is because 70% of Indian arms imports are from Russia, 14% from the US, and 5% from Israel. In a meeting of the Quadrilateral Security Dialogue on the implications of the crisis for the region, President Biden noted India's abstention, saying that most global allies were united against Russia. Speaking to the US Senate Foreign Relations Committee, US diplomat Donald Lu said the Biden administration was still considering sanctions against India over its S-400 deal with Russia, and its abstention at the UN. On 15 July 2022, the United States House of Representatives passed a legislative amendment that granted India a waiver from CAATSA-related sanctions connected to the purchase of the S-400; however the amendment has yet to be passed by the United States Senate.

While some officials of Ukraine has called for Western sanctions against India over its heavy buying of Russian oil, U.S. Assistant Secretary of State for European and Eurasian Affairs Karen Donfried told reporters in February 2023: "We are not looking to sanction India. Our partnership with India is one of our most consequential relationships."

Embassies and Consulates 
US Missions in India

 New Delhi (Embassy)
 Mumbai (Consulate)
 Kolkata (Consulate)
 Chennai (Consulate)
 Hyderabad (Consulate)
Indian Missions in US

 Washington, DC (Embassy)
 Houston (Consulate)
 Chicago (Consulate)
 New York (Consulate)
 San Francisco (Consulate)

See also

 Geostrategic
 Blue Team (U.S. politics)
 China containment policy
 India as an emerging superpower
 India–United States Civil Nuclear Agreement
 Malabar (naval exercise)
 Quadrilateral Security Dialogue
 String of Pearls (Indian Ocean)

 Cultural and peoples relations
 Sikhism in the United States
 Hinduism in the United States
 Americans in India
 Indian Americans
 Buddhism in the United States

 Foreign relations 
 Canada–India relations
 China-United States relations
 Foreign relations of the United States
 Foreign relations of India
 India–European Union relations
 Pakistan–United States relations
 Next Steps in Strategic Partnership

Notes

Further reading 

 Aspen Institute India. The United States and India: A Shared Strategic Future (Council on Foreign Relations, 2011)  online
 Ayres, Alyssa and C. Raja Mohan, eds. Power Realignments in Asia: China, India and the United States (2009)  excerpt and text search
 Barnds, William J. India, Pakistan, and the Great Powers (1972)
 Brands, H. W. India and the United States: The Cold Peace (1990) online free to borrow
 Brands, H. W. Inside the Cold War: Loy Henderson and the Rise of the American Empire 1918–1961 (1991) pp 196–230; Loy Henderson was US Ambassador, 1948–51
 Chary, M. Srinivas. The Eagle and the Peacock: U.S. Foreign Policy toward India since Independence (1995) excerpt
 Chaudhuri, Rudra. Forged in Crisis: India and the United States since 1947 (Oxford UP, 2014); online; DOI:10.1093/acprof:oso/9780199354863.001.0001
 Clymer, Kenton J. Quest for Freedom: The United States and India's Independence (1995) 
 Gopal, Sarvepalli. Jawaharlal Nehru: a Biography Volume 1 1889-1947 (1975); Jawaharlal Nehru Vol. 2 1947-1956 (1979); Jawaharlal Nehru: A Biography Volume 3 1956-1964 (2014), detailed coverage of diplomacy
 Gould, H.A. and S. Ganguly, eds. The hope and the reality: US-Indian relations from Roosevelt to Reagan (1992).
 Govil, Nitin. Orienting Hollywood: A Century of Film Culture Between Los Angeles and Bombay (NYU Press, 2015)
 Hart, David M., and Zoltan J. Acs. "High-tech immigrant entrepreneurship in the United States." Economic Development Quarterly (2011) 25#2 pp: 116–129. online	
  Heimsath, C.H. and Surjit Mansingh. A diplomatic history of modern India (1971) online
 Hilsman, Roger. To move a nation; the politics of foreign policy in the administration of John F. Kennedy (1967) pp 275–357. on 1961–63.
 Isaacs, Harold R. Scratches on Our Minds: American Images of China and India (1958) online
 Jackson, Carl T. "The Influence of Asia upon American Thought: A Bibliographical Essay." American Studies International 22#1 (1984), pp. 3–31, online covers China, India & Japan
 Jain, Rashmi K. The United States and India: 1947–2006 A Documentary Study (2007)
Karl, David J. "U.S.-India Relations: The Way Forward," Orbis (2012) 56#2 pp 308–327 online
 Kux, Dennis. India and The United States: Estranged Democracies 1941–1991 (1993)
 McMahon, Robert J. Cold War on the Periphery: The United States, India and Pakistan (1994)  excerpt and text search
 Madan, Tanvi. "With an eye to the east: the China factor and the US-India relationship, 1949-1979" (PhD dissertation, U Texas 2012).   online free
 Malone, David M., C. Raja Mohan, and Srinath Raghavan, eds. The Oxford handbook of Indian foreign policy (2015) pp 481–94.

 Mishra, Sylvia. "Forged in Crisis: India and the United States since 1947." Indian Foreign Affairs Journal 9#3 (2014): 301+.
 Mistry, Dinshaw. Aligning Unevenly: India and the United States (Honolulu: East-West Center, 2016), focus after 2000   online.

 Raghavan, Srinath. The Most Dangerous Place: A History of the United States in South Asia. (Penguin Random House India, 2018); also published as Fierce Enigmas: A History of the United States in South Asia.(2018 )
 Rani, Sudesh.  "Indo-US Maritime Cooperation: Challenges and Prospects," Maritime Affairs: Journal of the National Maritime Foundation of India, Vol. 8, No. 2, (December 2012) Pages: 123-43 
 Rotter, Andrew J. Comrades at Odds: The United States and India, 1947–1964 (2000) 
 Roy, Dr. P. C. Indo-U.S. Economic Relations. Rajouri Garden, New Delhi: Deep & Deep Publications, 1986. 73–125.
 Schaffer, Teresita C. India and the United States in the 21st Century: Reinventing Partnership (2010)
 Sharma, G. D. Indo Us Defence Cooperation (Vij Books, 2012), excerpt and text search
 Sokolski, Henry. United States and India Strategic Cooperation (2010)
 Vinod, M.J. United States foreign policy toward India (1991)

Recent

 Bajpai, Kanti, Selina Ho, and Manjari Chatterjee Miller, eds. Routledge Handbook of China–India Relations (Routledge, 2020). excerpt
 Malone, David M., C. Raja Mohan, and Srinath Raghavan, eds. The Oxford handbook of Indian foreign policy (2015) excerpt pp 481–494.
 Martin, Michael F., et al. "India-U.S. Economic Relations: In Brief" Current Politics and Economics of Northern and Western Asia 24#1 (2015): 99+. 
 Mukherjee, Rohan. "Chaos as opportunity: the United States and world order in India’s grand strategy." Contemporary Politics 26.4 (2020): 420-438 online.
 Raghavan, Srinath. The Most Dangerous Place: A History of the United States in South Asia. (Penguin Random House India, 2018); also published as Fierce Enigmas: A History of the United States in South Asia.(2018). online review; also see excerpt
 Rajagopalan, Rajesh. "U.S.-India Relations under President Trump: Promise and Peril." Asia Policy, no. 24 (2017).
 Rubinoff, Arthur G. "Missed opportunities and contradictory policies: Indo-American relations in the Clinton-Rao years." Pacific Affairs (1996): 499-517 online
 Talbott, Strobe. Engaging India: Diplomacy, democracy, and the bomb (Brookings Institution Press, 2010). online 
 Tellis, Ashley J. ‘The Surprising Success of the U.S.-Indian Partnership: Trump and Modi Have Deepened Defense Cooperation Against the Odds’. Foreign Affairs 20 (February 2020) online
 Tellis, Ashley. "Narendra Modi and US–India Relations." in Making of New India: Transformation Under Modi Government (2018): 525-535 online.
 van de Wetering, Carina.  Changing US Foreign Policy toward India: US-India Relations since the Cold War (2016) excerpt

Primary sources
, US ambassador 1951–53 and 1963–69;   excerpt and text search
 Bowles, Chester. Promises to Keep (1972), autobiography; pp 531–79 by US ambassador 1951–53 and 1963–69
 Galbraith, John K. Ambassador's journal: a personal account of the Kennedy years (1969) online, he was US ambassador to India 1961–63
 U.S. Department of State.  Foreign Relations of the United States (FRUS), many volumes of primary sources; the complete texts of these large books are all online. See Guide to FRUS. For example, Foreign Relations of the United States, 1969–1976, Volume XI, South Asia Crisis, 1971 was published in 2005 and is online here. The most recent volumes are Foreign Relations of the United States, 1969–1976, Volume E–7, Documents on South Asia, 1969–1972 (2005) online here and Foreign Relations of the United States, 1969–1976, Volume E–8, Documents on South Asia, 1973–1976 (2007) online here.

External links

 Highlights of Indo-U.S Visit 2015
 Highlights of India US Bilateral Ties and Cooperation as of 2013
 Blake, Jr., Robert O. "U.S.-India Relations: the Making of a Comprehensive Relationship." U.S. official speech at India's Army War College, August 23, 2004; online
 History of India – U.S. Relations, official U.S. site
 India-U.S. Relations  Congressional Research Service
 Indian Embassy: India – U.S. Relations: A General Overview, official Indian site
 Deepening U.S.-India Economic Engagement, Q&A with U.S. Ambassador Susan Esserman (September 2011)
 A Way Forward in U.S.-India Defense Cooperation, July 2011 interview with Stephen P. Cohen and Sunil Dasgupta
 Charting the Future of U.S.-India Relations, June 2011 interview with Ambassador Thomas R. Pickering
 U.S. Department of state: The Future of US-India Relations
 U.S. Department of Agriculture: U.S.–India Trade Relations

 
United States
Bilateral relations of the United States